Xylotrechus hovorei is a species of beetle in the family Cerambycidae. It was described by Swift in 2007.

References

Xylotrechus
Beetles described in 2007